Kirori Mal College is a constituent college of the University of Delhi. Established in 1954, it is located in the North Campus of the university in New Delhi, India. It offers undergraduate and postgraduate programmes in the sciences, humanities, social sciences and commerce. The National Assessment and Accreditation Council accredited it with a CGPA of 3.54 (A++) in 2023, which is the third highest among all Delhi University colleges.

History
The college began as Nirmala College and was located on Delhi Road. Faced with problems relating to the staff in the period following the partition, the management of the college changed hands and the trust founded by Seth Kirori Mal took over. It shifted to its present campus on 1 February 1954. The foundation stones of the college were laid down by the first President of India, Rajendra Prasad in the summer of 1955. The campus infrastructure was designed by the famous architect duo Anand Apte and CSH Jhabvala.

The first principal of the college was Ch. Hardwari Lal (1954–57). Kirori Mal College began its first full-fledged functioning from the academic session 1956–57. He was followed by Dr Sarup Singh (1957–65) who later became the Professor-and-Head, Department of English, University of Delhi and then the Vice-Chancellor, DU, followed by becoming the Lt. Governor, Delhi and then the Governor of Gujarat.

Kirori Mal College was one of the few institutions of the University of Delhi selected for sports training during the Commonwealth Games in 2010 which led to new facilities being created in the form of a new building and a gymnasium to facilitate sports and other activities.

Departments 

Department of Bengali
Department of Botany
Department of Chemistry
Department of Commerce
Department of Computer Science
Department of Economics
Department of English
Department of Geography
Department of Hindi
Department of History
Department of Mathematics
Department of Philosophy
Department of Physical Education and Sport Sciences
Department of Physics
Department of Political Science
Department of Sanskrit
Department of Urdu
Department of Statistics
Department of Zoology

Student societies
The college has societies in drama, debate, quiz, music, fine arts, photography, astronomy, robotics, enactus, environment, dance, and film. The drama society of the college is called Players. Kartavya – The Civil Services Society is a hub for the civil services aspirant students.

Hostel
The college hostel is situated next to the sports complex of the college. Its 89 rooms house around 170 undergraduate and postgraduate students from both India and abroad. Hostel seats are allocated to various courses and admission is made on the basis of merit.

Rankings
The National Assessment and Accreditation Council accredited it with a CGPA of 3.54 (A++) in 2016, which is the third highest among all Delhi University colleges. The college was ranked 18th among colleges in India by the NIRF, Ministry of Human Resource Development in 2019 and 19th in 2020. Kirori Mal College was ranked 10th among colleges in India according to the latest NIRF rankings by Ministry of Human Resource Development in 2022.

Notable alumni

Kirori Mal College has a large alumni base. Notable members include:

Actors, directors and singers
Habib Faisal - Screenwriter and Director
 Krishnakumar Kunnath - Playback Singer
 Amitabh Bachchan - actor
 Satish Kaushik - actor, director
 Ravi Baswani - film actor
 Siddharth Narayan - actor
 Prashant Narayanan - actor
 Sanam Puri - singer
 Shakti Kapoor - actor and comedian
 Vijay Raaz - film actor
 Divyendu Sharma - actor
 Sushant Singh - film and television actor
 Mohammed Zeeshan Ayyub -  actor
 Ali Abbas Zafar - director
 Vijay Krishna Acharya -  screenwriter and director
 Kabir Khan - director
 Sargun Mehta - television actress
 Sonam Sherpa musician Parikrama

Politicians

 Naveen Patnaik -Indian politician, Chief Minister of Odisha, India and the chief of Biju Janata Dal, a regional political party in Odisha. He is a writer and has published three books
 Madanlal Khurana - former Chief Minister of Delhi
 Rangarajan Kumaramangalam -politician
 G.P. Koirala -  Former Prime Minister of Nepal
 Pravesh Verma, Delhi politician

Others

 Padmavathy Bandopadhyay - first woman Air Marshal of Indian Air Force
 Habib Faisal - Hindi screenwriter and director
 Aditya Ghosh - Businessman  who worked in aviation and hospitality 
 Gaurav Bidhuri - boxer who won medal at World Championship
 Yogesh Kathuniya - Paralympic Athlete - Discus throw
 Vaibhav Singh Yadav - World Boxing Council(WBC) Asia & Asian Boxing Federation(ABF) Titles Champion
 M.S. Kohli - Indian mountaineer
 Massoud Khalili
 M. S. Krishnan -Chair of Business Information Technology at the University of Michigan's Ross School of Business
 Abhay Kumar - poet, artist and diplomat
 Sanjivan Lal - film maker
 Harbans Mukhia - Indian historian 
 Saeed Naqvi - journalist
 Parikrama - band
 Raghuvendra Singh Rathore
 Rajshekhar -Indian lyricist
 Himanshu Sharma - Bollywood screenwriter
 Mrityunjay Kumar Singh 
 Dinesh Thakur - theatre director
 Mirza Waheed - Writer
 Arjun Dev- Writer, Educationist and Historian, he co-wrote some of the extremely popular NCERT books
 Sandeep Maheshwari - Entrepreneur & Motivational Speaker

Notable faculty
 Hiren Gohain
 Krishna Kumar
 Sarup Singh (ex-VC, University of Delhi and former governor of Kerala and Gujarat )

References

External links
 

Universities and colleges in Delhi
Delhi University
Educational institutions established in 1954
1954 establishments in India
Commerce colleges in India
Science colleges in India
Arts colleges in India